Philip Donald Andrews (born 14 September 1976) is an English former professional footballer who played as a forward in the Football League for Brighton & Hove Albion.

Life and career
Andrews was born in Andover, Hampshire, in 1976. He played youth football for Basingstoke Town and Fleet Town before joining Brighton & Hove Albion as a trainee in 1993. He made his senior debut in April 1994 in a Second Division match away to Cambridge United. He turned professional a year later, but never established himself as a first-team player. Of his 36 appearances, all but 5 were as a substitute. He was released at the end of the 1996–97 season, and signed for Bashley of the Southern League, where he spent four years. He later played for clubs including Dorchester Town, Weymouth, Andover and Amesbury Town.

References

1976 births
Living people
People from Andover, Hampshire
English footballers
Association football forwards
Basingstoke Town F.C. players
Fleet Town F.C. players
Brighton & Hove Albion F.C. players
Bashley F.C. players
Dorchester Town F.C. players
Weymouth F.C. players
Andover F.C. players
Amesbury Town F.C. players
English Football League players
Southern Football League players